Zoltán Boros (28 June 1948) is a Hungarian orienteering competitor. He received a bronze medal in the relay event at the 1972 World Orienteering Championships in Jičín, together with János Sőtér, Géza Vajda and András Hegedűs. At the 1974 World Championships in Viborg he placed sixth in the relay with the Hungarian team.

References

1948 births
Living people
Hungarian orienteers
Male orienteers
Foot orienteers
World Orienteering Championships medalists